Kōzaki Station can refer to the following train stations in Japan:

 Kōzaki Station (Ōita) (幸崎駅), operated by JR Kyushu
 Kōzaki Station (Wakayama) (神前駅), operated by Wakayama Electric Railway